Climate Change Bill may refer to:

 American Clean Energy and Security Act
 The Bill for the Climate Change Act 2008